Lorie O'Clare is an American author of erotic romance, romantic suspense and paranormal romance novels.

The anthology Men of Danger, which featured her story “Love Me 'til Death,” was a New York Times bestseller.

Bibliography

Published by St. Martin’s Press
 Long, Lean and Lethal, 2009
 Tall, Dark and Deadly, 2009
 Get Lucky, 2011
 Play Dirty, 2010
 Strong, Sleek and Sinful, 2010
 Stay Hungry, 2011
 Run Wild, 2012
 Slow Heat, 2012
 Hot Pursuit, 2013

Published by Ellora's Cave
 Lunewulf Law, 2003
 Blue Moon, 2004
 In Her Blood, 2004
 In Her Nature, 2004
 In Her Soul, 2004
 In Her Dreams, 2004
 Jaded Prey, 2004
 Man Of Her Dreams, 2004
 Sex Traders, 2004
 Tainted Purity, 2004
 Waiting for Yesterday, 2004
 After Dusk, 2005
 Taming Heather, 2005
 Challenged Pursuit, 2005
 Caught!, 2005
 The First Time, 2005
 Lotus Blooming, 2005
 Pursuit, 2005
 Waiting for Dawn, 2005
 Dead World, 2006
 Far From Innocent, 2006
 Living Extinct, 2006
 Penance, 2006
 Shara's Challenge, 2006
 Alpha Exiled, 2007
 For Life, 2007
 Forbidden Attraction, 2007
 Issue of Trust, 2007
 Taking it All, 2007
 Til Death, 2007
 Full Moon Rising, 2008
 Unshackled, 2008	
 Vision Captured, 2008
 Vision Controller, 2008
 Vision Fulfilled, 2008
 Challenged, 2009	
 Elements Unbound, 2009
 Feather Down, 2009
 Feather Possessed, 2009
 Wicked, 2009
 Vision Lust, 2009
 Vision Revealed, 2009
 Black Seduction, 2010
 Black Passion, 2010
 Feather Torn, 2010
 Feather Adored, 2010
 Black Surrender, 2011
 With Her Hunger, 2011

Published by Kensington
 Pleasure Island, 2009
 Seduction Island, 2009
 Temptation Island, 2011
 Island of Desire, 2012

Anthologies
 Primal Heat, Ellora's Cave, 2004	
 Things That Go Bump in the Night IV, Ellora's Cave, 2004
 Forbidden Fantasies, Pocket Books, 2008
 Under The Covers, Kensington Books, 2009
 Men of Danger, St. Martin’s Press, 2010
 The Bodyguard, St. Martin’s Press, 2010
 Feel The Heat, Kensington, 2011

References

American women writers
Year of birth missing (living people)
Living people
21st-century American women